Shawn Hamilton Rivers (born January 30, 1971) is a Canadian former professional ice hockey defenceman.  He played four games in the National Hockey League with the Tampa Bay Lightning during the 1992–93 season, scoring two assists.  Prior to his professional career, he played for the St. Lawrence University Skating Saints, where he was named the ECAC All Rookie Team for the 1988–89 season. Shawn is the brother of Jamie Rivers.

Rivers was born in Ottawa, Ontario.

Career statistics

Regular season and playoffs

Awards and honors

References

External links

1971 births
Atlanta Knights players
Augsburger Panther players
Canadian ice hockey defencemen
Chicago Wolves (IHL) players
HC Milano players
Ice hockey people from Ottawa
EHC Kloten players
Lake Charles Ice Pirates players
Living people
St. Lawrence Saints men's ice hockey players
San Antonio Dragons players
Springfield Falcons players
Sudbury Wolves players
Syracuse Crunch players
Tampa Bay Lightning players
Undrafted National Hockey League players
Canadian expatriate ice hockey players in Germany